Appe Teacher is a 2018 Indian Tulu film directed by Kishor Moodabidre and produced under the banner Swayam Prabha Movies and Entertainment. Its director debuts the movie as a director early before he has worked for more than 14 movies and serials as an associate director and co-director. In lead roles Devadas Kapikad, Naveen D. Padil, Bhojaraj Vamanjoor, Aravind Bolar, Usha Bhandary, Sathish Bandale, Umeash Mijar feature in supporting roles.

Cast
 Sunil
 Devadas Kapikad
 Naveen D. Padil
 Bhojaraj Vamanjoor
 Aravind Bolar
 Gopinath Bhat
 Sathish Bandale
 Usha Bhandary
 Shailashree

Soundtrack

The soundtrack of the film was composed by Vanil Vegas and background score by Ravi Basrur.

References

External links